Liris is a genus of solitary, ground-nesting, predaceous wasps, containing over 300 species. It contains two subgenera: Leptolarra and Motes, with most of the species falling within subgenus Leptolarra.

See also
 List of Liris species

References

Crabronidae
Apoidea genera